Rusi or RUSI may refer to:

Places in Romania
 Ruși River, Romania
 Ruși, a district in the town of Zlatna, Alba County
 Ruși, a village in Bretea Română, Hunedoara County
 Ruși, a village in Slimnic, Sibiu County
 Ruși, a village in Forăști, Suceava County
 Ruși, a village in Puiești, Vaslui

People
 Alpo Rusi (born 1949), Finnish diplomat
 Jukka Rusi (1935–2004), Finnish journalist and spy

Other uses
 Royal United Services Institute, a British defence and security think tank
 Republic of the United States of Indonesia, a former federal state
 Rusi (film), a 1984 Tamil-language Indian feature film

See also
 Ruși-Ciutea, a village in Letea Veche Commune, Bacău County, Romania
 Rușii-Munți, a commune in Mureș County, Romania